The Pink Line (Line 7) is a metro rail line of the Delhi Metro, a rapid transit system in Delhi, India.  It consists of 38 metro stations from Majlis Park to Shiv Vihar, both in North Delhi.

It is mostly elevated and covers Delhi in an almost 'U' shaped pattern. The Pink Line is also known as the Ring Road Line, as the entire line passes alongside the busy Ring Road in Delhi, that witnesses massive traffic jams every day.

The Pink Line has interchanges with most of the operational lines of the network such as the Red Line at Netaji Subhash Place & Welcome, Yellow Line at Azadpur & Dilli Haat - INA, Green Line at Punjabi Bagh West, Blue Line at Rajouri Garden, Mayur Vihar Phase-I, Anand Vihar & Karkarduma, Dhaula Kuan of Airport Express (Orange Line) at Durgabai Deshmukh South Campus, Violet Line at Lajpat Nagar, as well as with Hazrat Nizamuddin and Anand Vihar Terminal (Indian Railways) and the ISBTs at Anand Vihar and Sarai Kale Khan.

The Pink Line has the highest point of Delhi Metro at Dhaula Kuan with a height of 23.6 metres, passing over the Dhaula Kuan grade separator flyovers and the Airport Express Line. It also possesses the country's smallest metro station, Ashram, with a size of just 151.6 metres against the usual 265 metres. Also, the platform for a six-coach train is 140 metres but has been reduced to 135 metres in the Ashram station.

The line will be extended to Maujpur - Babarpur, creating one of the world's longest ring lines in the city. The Maujpur - Babarpur to Shiv Vihar section will then act as a branch line. The extension is expected to be completed by November 2024.

History 
There are 38 stations in the Pink Line, out of which 26 are elevated and 12 are underground.

The line was opened in five stages from March 2018 to August 2021. The first section on the Pink Line become operational from 14 March 2018 between Majlis Park to Durgabai Deshmukh South Campus, thereafter the section between Durgabai Deshmukh South Campus and Lajpat Nagar was opened on 6 August 2018, Shiv Vihar to Trilokpuri was opened on 31 October 2018. The section between Lajpat Nagar to Mayur Vihar Pocket I was opened on 31 December 2018.

The section between Trilokpuri Sanjay Lake and Mayur Vihar Pocket I was not completed as construction of a 1.5 km viaduct began late due to land acquisition issues at Trilokpuri. This had rendered the Pink Line into two independent lines. Trains from Majlis Park would terminate at Mayur Vihar Pocket 1, while trains coming from Shiv Vihar would terminate at either IP Extension or Trilokpuri Sanjay Lake.

The final section between Trilokpuri Sanjay Lake and Mayur Vihar Pocket I was opened on 6 August 2021.

Stations 

The stations of the Pink Line are:

Train Info

See also 
List of Delhi Metro stations
Transport in Delhi
Delhi Metro Rail Corporation
Delhi Suburban Railway

References

External links 

 Delhi Metro Rail Corporation Ltd. (Official site) 
 Delhi Metro Annual Reports
  
 Delhi Metro Pink Line Details

Delhi Metro lines
Railway lines opened in 2018